DYRD (1161 AM) is a radio station owned and operated by the Bohol Chronicle Radio Corporation. The station's studio is located at Bohol Chronicle Bldg., #56 Bernardino Inting St., Tagbilaran, and its transmitter facilities are located along Burgos St., Tagbilaran. Based on a survey conducted by Holy Name University Center for Research and Publications in 2016, it is ranked as the most listened to AM station.

References

News and talk radio stations in the Philippines
Radio stations established in 2007
Radio stations in Bohol